Rosalind Miles (January 15, 1940 – February 8, 2022) was an American film and television actress and fashion model. Miles was most known for her roles in film during the early to late 1970s. Miles appeared in mostly American blaxploitation films such as; Shaft's Big Score!, The Black Six and Friday Foster.

Biography

Early life 
Miles was born Rosalind Beatrice Medlock in Houston, Texas.

Career 
Miles moved to Los Angeles, California, to pursue her career in acting. Miles worked as a waitress in a local restaurant when she was discovered by a talent scout. In 1971, Miles made her film debut in Russel Vincent's How's Your Love Life? as Julie. Miles had several television appearances before her most notable role. In 1972, Miles played Arna Asby, the girlfriend of Shaft in the action film Shaft's Big Score!. After Shaft, Miles received a lead role as Erica in Al Adamson's 1974 crime film I Spit on Your Corpse (also known as Girls For Rent). Miles had  roles in such films as The Black Six (1973), The Manhandlers (1974).

Miles appeared alongside Pam Grier as Cloris Boston, a fashion model, in 1975's blaxploitation film Friday Foster. In 1977, Miles auditioned for the role of Coretta Scott King for the NBC television mini-series based on the life of Dr. Martin Luther King, Jr. King, but the role was portrayed by Cicely Tyson. Miles last acting role was in Ernest Tidyman's To Kill A Cop in 1978. Miles was a part of the production of Guys and Dolls with her husband Todd Davis in 1981. Miles retired from acting in 1982.

Personal life and death
Miles married three times and had no children. Her first marriage was to her high school sweetheart James W. Powell from August 28, 1963, to August 1966. From January 1968 until October 1969, Miles was married to Robert L. Miles then actor Todd Davis from March 1979 until his death in July 2013.  Miles dated actor and martial artist Jim Kelly from 1973 to 1976. Miles died at her home in Los Angeles, California, on February 8, 2022, aged 82.

Filmography

Film

Television

References

External links 

1940 births
2022 deaths
African-American actresses
Actresses from Texas
American television actresses
20th-century African-American women
20th-century African-American people
American film actresses
People from Fort Worth, Texas
20th-century American actresses
21st-century African-American people
21st-century African-American women